The Abitibi greenstone belt is a 2,800-to-2,600-million-year-old greenstone belt that spans across the Ontario–Quebec border in Canada. It is mostly made of volcanic rocks, but also includes ultramafic rocks, mafic intrusions, granitoid rocks, and early and middle Precambrian sediments.

Geographical extent
The Abitibi greenstone belt is one of the world's largest Archean greenstone belts. It represents a series of subterranes that exhibit similar geological, geochemical, and isotopical signatures similar to those formed during the evolution of paired active-arc-back-arc systems. The huge 2,707-to-2,696-million-year-old Blake River Megacaldera Complex is within the belt.

See also
 Abitibi gold belt
 List of greenstone belts
 Volcanism of Canada
 Volcanism of Eastern Canada

References

Greenstone belts
Neoarchean volcanism
Precambrian Canada
Volcanism of Ontario
Volcanism of Quebec